Marlowe Morris (May 16, 1915 – May 28, 1978) was an American jazz pianist and organist. He was the nephew of Thomas Morris.

Biography

Morris also learned drums, harmonica, and ukulele as a child. He accompanied June Clark from 1935 to 1937, then played solo for a few years before playing with Coleman Hawkins in 1940–41. He served in the Army during World War II, then worked with Toby Browne, Al Sears, Sid Catlett, and Tiny Grimes in addition to leading his own trio in the early and middle 1940s; he also appeared in the film Jammin' the Blues in 1944. He quit playing full-time and worked in a post office later in the 1940s, then returned in 1949 to play primarily solo organ. He led a trio in the 1960s with Julian Dash as one of his sidemen, recording for Columbia Records.

Morris also recorded with Lester Young, Ben Webster, Big Joe Turner, Sister Rosetta Tharpe, Joe Williams and Jimmy Rushing.

From a review by radio disc-jockey Jim Bartlett of station Magic 98:

Discography
Play the Thing
With Joe Williams
A Night at Count Basie's (Vanguard, 1956)

Filmography
Jammin' the Blues (1944)

References

External links

1915 births
1978 deaths
American jazz pianists
American male pianists
20th-century American pianists
20th-century American male musicians
American male jazz musicians